"Maybe He'll Know" is the fifth and final single from American singer Cyndi Lauper's album, True Colors, released only in Europe in 1987. It is a remake of a song that Lauper recorded with her former band, Blue Angel. The two versions are slightly different lyrically in a few lines. Billy Joel joins Lauper in 'doo wop' style back-up vocal duties.

The Blue Angel version of the song appears in the 1999 film 200 Cigarettes after a quarter when Kate Hudson's character is in the restaurant's restroom composing herself. A remix of "Maybe He'll Know"—presumably created with the intention of single release in the U.S.—surfaced as the B-side to Lauper's "I Drove All Night".

Track listing

7"
A. "Maybe He'll Know" (Remix) – 3:44
B. "Time After Time" – 3:59

12"
A. "Maybe He'll Know" (Album Version) - 4:24
B1. "One Track Mind" - 3:39
B2. "Calm Inside The Storm" - 3:54

Cyndi Lauper songs
Doo-wop songs
1987 singles
Songs written by Cyndi Lauper
Songs written by John Turi
Song recordings produced by Roy Halee
Blue Angel (band) songs
1980 songs
Epic Records singles